Laurens is a masculine Dutch given name, the equivalent of Lawrence. Notable people with the name include:

 Laurens Jan Anjema (born 1982), Dutch squash player
 Laurens Jacobsz Alteras (died 1622), Dutch vice admiral
 Laurens Bake (1629-1702), Dutch poet
 Laurens Bogtman (1900-1969), Dutch baritone singer
 Laurens Jan Brinkhorst (born 1937), Dutch politician
 Laurens Janszoon Coster (c. 1370-c. 1440), Dutch printer
 Laurens Craen (c. 1620–c. 1670), Dutch painter
 Laurens ten Dam (born 1980), Dutch road racing cyclist
 Laurens de Graaf (c. 1653-probably 1704), Dutch pirate, mercenary and naval officer
 Laurens Theodorus Gronovius (1730-1777), Dutch naturalist
 Laurens Hammond (1895-1973), inventor of the Hammond organ
 Laurens ten Heuvel (born 1976), Dutch footballer
 Laurens Hull (1779-1865), American physician and politician
 Laurens Perseus Hickok (1798-1888), American philosopher
 Laurens van der Post (1906-1996), Afrikaner author, journalist, philosopher
 Laurens Reael (1583-1637), Governor-General of the Dutch East Indies (1616-1617) and an admiral of the Dutch navy (1625-1627)
 Laurens Shull (1894-1918), American football player, businessman and soldier
 Laurens Pieter van de Spiegel (1736-1800), Grand Pensionary of Zeeland and later of Holland
 Laurens Vanthoor (born 1991), Belgian auto racer
 Laurens van der Vinne (1658-1529), painter from the Netherlands
 Laurens De Vreese (born 1988), Belgian road bicycle racer

Dutch masculine given names